Eirik Kjønø (born 27 February 1991) is a Norwegian football coach and former player.

Playing career
Kjønø started his youth career with Kristiansand-based side Våg. In the summer of 2007, he joined Scottish side Falkirk on a two-year contract. He returned to Norway and Vindbjart in April 2009.

Managerial career
Kjønø's first club as manager was Oslo-based club Ready, which he managed in 2012. In 2014, he joined Grorud as an assistant coach, before being promoted to head coach in 2018. The club achieved promotion to the Norwegian First Division under his management in 2019. On 4 February 2021, he was appointed assistant coach of Eliteserien club Stabæk. Following Jan Jönsson's exit from the club, Kjønø was promoted to head coach on 9 July 2021. Stabæk ended the 2021 season with relegation to the Norwegian First Division.

Honours
Young manager of the year in Norway: 2018, 2019

References

1991 births
Living people
Sportspeople from Kristiansand
Norwegian footballers
Association football midfielders
Vindbjart FK players
Grorud IL players
Norwegian Second Division players
Norwegian Third Division players
Norwegian Fourth Division players
Norwegian football managers
Grorud IL managers
Stabæk Fotball managers
Eliteserien managers